gnuplot is a command-line and GUI program that can generate two- and three-dimensional plots of functions, data, and data fits. The program runs on all major computers and operating systems (Linux, Unix, Microsoft Windows, macOS, FreeDOS, and many others).
Originally released in 1986, its listed authors are Thomas Williams, Colin Kelley, Russell Lang, Dave Kotz, John Campbell, Gershon Elber, Alexander Woo "and many others." Despite its name, this software is not part of the GNU Project.

Features 
gnuplot can produce output directly on screen, or in many formats of graphics files, including Portable Network Graphics (PNG), Encapsulated PostScript (EPS), Scalable Vector Graphics (SVG), JPEG and many others. It is also capable of producing LaTeX code that can be included directly in LaTeX documents, making use of LaTeX's fonts and powerful formula notation abilities. The program can be used both interactively and in batch mode using scripts.

gnuplot can read data in multiple formats, including ability to read data on the fly generated by other programs (piping), create multiple plots on one image, do 2D, 3D, contour plots, parametric equations, supports various linear and non-linear coordinate systems, projections, geographic and time data reading and presentation, box plots of various forms, histograms, labels, and other custom elements on the plot, including shapes, text and images, that can be set manually, computed by script or automatically from input data.

gnuplot also provides scripting capabilities, looping, functions, text processing, variables, macros, arbitrary pre-processing of input data (usually across columns), as well ability to perform non-linear multi-dimensional multi-set weighted data fitting (see Curve fitting and Levenberg–Marquardt algorithm).

The gnuplot core code is programmed in C. Modular subsystems for output via Qt, wxWidgets, and LaTeX/TikZ/ConTeXt are written in C++ and Lua.

The code below creates the graph to the right.
set title "Some Math Functions"
set xrange [-10:10]
set yrange [-2:2]
set zeroaxis
plot (x/4)**2, sin(x), 1/x

The name of this program was originally chosen to avoid conflicts with a program called "newplot", and was originally a compromise between "llamaplot" and "nplot".

Support of Epidemic daily and week formats in Version 5.4.2 is a result of pandemic coronavirus data needs.

Development Version 5.5 is 2021 available.

Distribution terms 

Despite gnuplot's name, it is not named after, part of or related to the GNU Project, nor does it use the GNU General Public License. It was named as part of a compromise by the original authors, punning on gnu (the animal) and newplot.

Official source code to gnuplot is freely redistributable, but modified versions thereof are not. The gnuplot license allows instead distribution of patches against official releases, optionally accompanied by officially released source code. Binaries may be distributed along with the unmodified source code and any patches applied thereto. Contact information must be supplied with derived works for technical support for the modified software.

Permission to modify the software is granted, but not the right to distribute the complete modified source code. Modifications are to be distributed as patches to the released version.

Despite this restriction, gnuplot is accepted and used by many GNU packages and is widely included in Linux distributions including the stricter ones such as Debian and Fedora. The OSI Open Source Definition and the Debian Free Software Guidelines specifically allow for restrictions on distribution of modified source code, given explicit permission to distribute both patches and source code.

Newer gnuplot modules (e.g. Qt, wxWidgets, and cairo drivers) have been contributed under dual-licensing terms, e.g. gnuplot + BSD or gnuplot + GPL.

GUIs and programs that use gnuplot 
Several third-party programs have graphical user interfaces that can be used to generate graphs using gnuplot as the plotting engine. These include:

 gretl, a statistics package for econometrics
 JGNUPlot, a java-based GUI
 Kayali a computer algebra system
 xldlas, an old X11 statistics package
 gnuplotxyz, an old Windows program
 wxPinter, a graphical plot manager for gnuplot
 Maxima is a text-based computer algebra system which itself has several third-party GUIs.

Other programs that use gnuplot include:
 GNU Octave, a mathematical programming language 
 statist, a terminal-based program
 gplot.pl provides a simpler command-line interface.
 feedgnuplot provides a plotting of stored and realtime data from a pipe
 ElchemeaAnalytical, an impedance spectroscopy plotting and fitting program developed by DTU Energy
 Gnuplot add-in for Microsoft Excel
 Calc, the GNU Emacs calculator

Programming and application interfaces 
gnuplot can be used from various programming languages to graph data, including Perl (via PDL and other CPAN packages), Python (via gnuplotlib, Gnuplot-py and SageMath), R via (Rgnuplot), Julia (via Gaston.jl), Java (via JavaGnuplotHybrid and jgnuplot), Ruby (via Ruby Gnuplot), Ch (via Ch Gnuplot), Haskell (via Haskell gnuplot), Fortran 95, Smalltalk (Squeak and GNU Smalltalk) and Rust (via RustGnuplot).

gnuplot also supports piping, which is typical of scripts. For script-driven graphics, gnuplot is one of the most popular programs.

Gnuplot output formats 
Gnuplot allows the user to display or store plots in several ways:
On the console (output modes dumb, sixel)
In a desktop window (output modes Qt, wxt, X11, aquaterm, win, ...)
Embedded in a web page (output modes SVG, HTML5, PNG, JPEG, animated GIF, ...)
File formats designed for document processing (output modes PostScript, PDF, cgm, emf, LaTeX variants, ...)

See also 

 List of graphing software

References

Further reading and external links 

 
 
 Gnuplot 5: an interactive ebook about gnuplot v.5.
 gnuplotting: a blog of gnuplot examples and tips
 spplotters: a blog of gnuplot examples and tips
 gnuplot surprising: a blog of gnuplot examples and tips
 
  
 
 
 Visualize your data with gnuplot: an IBM tutorial

Articles containing video clips
Computer animation
Cross-platform free software
Data analysis software
Free 3D graphics software
Free educational software
Free mathematics software
Free plotting software
Free software programmed in C
Plotting software
Regression and curve fitting software
Software that uses wxWidgets
Software that uses Qt